The Port of Moldova Veche is one of the largest Romanian river ports, located in the town of Moldova Nouă on the Danube River. Located on the Danube's left bank, it straddles kilometers 1047 through 1050 of the river's course. It is mainly used for handling wood products, sand and gravel, bricks and fertilizers.

Official Website - Active

References

Ports and harbours of Romania